The ninth season of M*A*S*H aired Mondays at 9:00-9:30 pm on CBS.

Cast

Episodes

Notes

References

External links 
 List of M*A*S*H (season 9) episodes at the Internet Movie Database

1980 American television seasons
1981 American television seasons
MASH 09